Ivan Lendl defeated the defending champion John McEnroe in a rematch of the previous year's final, 7–6(7–1), 6–3, 6–4 to win the men's singles tennis title at the 1985 US Open. It was his first US Open title, following three consecutive runner-up finishes at the tournament.

Seeds
The seeded players are listed below. Ivan Lendl is the champion; others show the round in which they were eliminated.

  John McEnroe (finalist)
  Ivan Lendl (champion)
  Mats Wilander (semifinalist)
  Jimmy Connors (semifinalist)
  Kevin Curren (first round)
  Anders Järryd (quarterfinalist)
  Yannick Noah (quarterfinalist)
  Boris Becker (fourth round)
  Miloslav Mečíř (second round)
  Joakim Nyström (quarterfinalist)
  Stefan Edberg (fourth round)
  Johan Kriek (second round)
  Tim Mayotte (fourth round)
  Henrik Sundström (first round)
  Scott Davis (second round)
  Tomáš Šmíd (fourth round)

Draw

Key
 Q = Qualifier
 WC = Wild card
 LL = Lucky loser
 r = Retired

Final eight

Section 1

Section 2

Section 3

Section 4

Section 5

Section 6

Section 7

Section 8

External links
 Association of Tennis Professionals (ATP) – 1985 US Open Men's Singles draw
1985 US Open – Men's draws and results at the International Tennis Federation

Men's singles
US Open (tennis) by year – Men's singles